Michele Fanelli (14 September 1907 – 13 December 1989) was an Italian long-distance runner. He competed in the marathon at the 1932 Summer Olympics.

See also
 Italy at the 1934 European Athletics Championships

References

External links
 

1907 births
1989 deaths
Sportspeople from the Province of Foggia
Athletes (track and field) at the 1932 Summer Olympics
Italian male long-distance runners
Italian male marathon runners
Olympic athletes of Italy